This is a complete list of American football players who have played for the Philadelphia Eagles of the National Football League (NFL). It includes players that have played at least one game in the NFL regular season. The Philadelphia Eagles franchise was founded in 1933. The Eagles played in four pre-Super Bowl Era NFL Championships (1947, 1948, 1949 and 1960) winning three (1948, 1949 and 1960). They have also played in three Super Bowls (XV, XXXIX and LII), winning Super Bowl LII.



A
Walter Abercrombie,
Victor Abiamiri,
Dick Absher,
Emmanuel Acho, 
Jamar Adams,
Josh Adams,
Keith Adams,
Ben Agajanian,
Nelson Agholor,
Kamar Aiken,
Jay Ajayi,
Seyi Ajirotutu,
David Akers,
David Alexander,
Kermit Alexander,
Beau Allen,
Chuck Allen,
Eric Allen,
Ian Allen,
Jackie Allen,
Kevin Allen,
Nate Allen,
Ty Allert,
Henry Allison,
Kiko Alonso,
Glen Amerson,
George Amundson,
Colt Anderson,
Gary Anderson,
Shawn Andrews,
Stacy Andrews,
Jim Angelo,
Houston Antwine,
Dave Archer,
Justin Armour,
Calvin Armstrong,
Harvey Armstrong,
Neill Armstrong,
Jay Arnold,
Rick Arrington,
Darrel Aschbacher,
Jamie Asher,
Nnamdi Asomugha,
Steve Atkins,
Howard Auer,
Jim Auer,
Miles Austin,
Darnell Autry,
Jason Avant,
Marvin Ayers

B

Joe Bachie,
Jason Babin,
Matt Bahr,
David Bailey,
Eric Bailey,
Howard Bailey,
Tom Bailey,
Victor Bailey,
Al Baisi,
Jason Baker,
John Baker,
Keith Baker,
Ron Baker,
Sam Baker,
Tony Baker,
Brian Baldinger,
Gary Ballman,
Steve Banas,
Bruno Banducci,
Jack Banta,
Allen Barbre,
Shawn Barber,
Bryan Barker,
Corey Barlow,
Billy Ray Barnes,
Larry Barnes,
Walt Barnes,
Kenjon Barner,
Derek Barnett,
Fred Barnett,
Dan Barnhardt,
Roy Barni,
Len Barnum,
Sam Bartholomew,
Doug Bartlett,
Matt Barkley,
Ephesians Bartley,
Mike Bartrum,
Connor Barwin,
Mike Basca,
Hank Baskett,
Dick Bassi,
Herman Bassman,
Matt Battaglia,
Maxie Baughan,
Alfred Bauman,
Frank Bausch,
Mark Bavaro,
Bibbles Bawel,
Winford Baze,
Pat Beach,
Shawn Beals,
Jim Beaver,
Ian Beckles,
Chuck Bednarik,
Randy Beisler,
Eddie Bell,
Todd Bell,
Mike Bellamy,
Vic Bellamy,
Jesse Bendross,
Henry Benson,
Mitch Berger,
Bill Bergey,
Will Berzinski,
James Betterson,
Dick Bielski,
Eric Bieniemy,
John Binotto,
Blaine Bishop,
Bob Bjorklund,
Mike Black,
Richard Blackmore,
Ed Blaine,
Jeff Blake,
Jeff Bleamer,
Mel Bleeker,
Luther Blue,
Ron Blye,
Harry Boatswain,
Bill Boedeker,
Gary Bolden,
Chris Boniol,
John Booty,
Mike Boryla,
James Bostic,
Jason Bostic,
Lee Bouggess,
Tony Bova,
Kevin Bowman,
Deral Boykin,
Bill Bradley,
Carlos Bradley,
Harold Bradley, Jr.,
Stewart Bradley,
Sam Bradford,
John Bredice,
Leo Brennan,
Jack Brewer,
John Brewer,
Bubby Brister,
Rankin Britt,
Barrett Brooks,
Clifford Brooks,
Tony Brooks,
Tom Brookshier,
Luther Broughton,
Aaron Brown,
Bob Brown,
Cedrick Brown,
David Brown,
Deauntae Brown,
Fred Brown,
Greg Brown,
Jerome Brown,
Na Brown,
Reggie Brown (RB),
Reggie Brown (WR),
Ronnie Brown,
Sheldon Brown,
Thomas Brown,
Tim Brown,
Willie Brown,
Don Brumm,
Daryon Brutley,
Bill Bryant,
Doug Brzezinski,
Correll Buckhalter,
Eldra Buckley,
Frank Budd,
Joe Bukant,
Norm Bulaich,
Ronnie Bull,
Brodrick Bunkley,
John Bunting,
Derrick Burgess,
Adrian Burk,
Mark Burke,
Tom Burnette,
Lem Burnham,
Hank Burnine,
Don Burroughs,
Ron Burroughs,
Thomas Bushby,
Art Buss,
Bob Butler,
John Butler,
Keith Byars,
Bill Byrne,

C
Larry Cabrelli,
Lee Roy Caffey,
Jim Cagle,
Dave Cahill,
Mike Caldwell,
Don Calhoun,
Lonny Calicchio,
Ernie Calloway,
Glenn Campbell,
Jesse Campbell,
Marion Campbell,
Stan Campbell,
Tommy Campbell,
Billy Campfield,
T. J. Campion,
Rocco Canale,
Harold Carmichael,
Joe Carollo,
Joe Carpe,
Rob Carpenter,
Earl Carr,
Jimmy Carr,
Russ Carroccio,
Carlos Carson,
Cris Carter,
Joe Carter,
Pete Case,
Howard Cassady,
Jim Castiglia,
Thomas Caterbone,
Tom Catlin,
Matt Cavanaugh,
Quinton Caver,
Brent Celek,
Tony Cemore,
Gene Ceppetelli,
Mike Chalenski,
Jamar Chaney,
Dick Chapura,
Louis Cheek,
Je'Rod Cherry,
Chuck Cherundolo,
Al Chesley,
Wes Chesson,
Don Chuy,
Gus Cifelli,
Al Clark,
Mike Clark,
Algy Clark,
Willie Clark,
Adrien Clarke,
Ken Clarke,
Keenan Clayton,
Chris Clemons,
Topper Clemons,
Garry Cobb,
Bill Cody,
Steve Colavito,
John Cole,
Nick Cole,
Trent Cole,
Al Coleman,
Kurt Coleman,
Marco Coleman,
Bruce Collie,
Wayne Colman,
Bill Combs,
Jack Concannon,
Larry Conjar,
Ray Conlin,
Darion Conner,
Sean Considine,
Enio Conti,
Al Conway,
Joe Conwell,
Leon Cook,
Rashard Cook,
Ed Cooke,
Evan Cooper,
Louis Cooper,
Richard Cooper,
Riley Cooper,
Russell Copeland,
Frank Cornish,
Jose Cortez,
Zed Coston,
Paige Cothren,
Bill Cowher,
Jerry Cowhig,
Claude Crabb,
Russ Craft,
Jerry Crafts,
Charles Crawford,
Bob Creech,
Smiley Creswell,
Terry Crews,
Bill Cronin,
Jason Croom,
Irv Cross,
Larry Crowe,
Darrel Crutchfield,
Paul Cuba,
Jim Culbreath,
Willie Cullars,
George Cumby,
Dick Cunningham,
Randall Cunningham,
Bree Cuppoletti,
Mike Curcio,
Kevin Curtis,
Scott Curtis

D

Frank D'Agostino,
Torrance Daniels,
Byron Darby,
Trey Darilek,
James Darling,
Matt Darwin,
Al Davis,
Antone Davis,
Bob Davis,
Norm Davis,
Pernell Davis,
Stan Davis,
Vern Davis,
Brian Dawkins,
Dale Dawson,
Ted Dean,
Steve DeLine,
Jeff Dellenbach,
Jerry DeLucca,
Quintin Demps,
Jack Dempsey,
Tom Dempsey,
Mark Dennard,
Richard Dent,
Dan DeSantis,
Koy Detmer,
Ty Detmer,
Dennis DeVaughn,
Alan Dial,
Benjy Dial,
David Diaz-Infante,
Kori Dickerson,
Dave DiFilippo,
Tom Dimmick,
Charles Dimry,
Nate Dingle,
Mike Dirks,
Mike Ditka,
Al Dixon,
Antonio Dixon,
Floyd Dixon,
Ronnie Dixon,
Zachary Dixon,
Herb Dobbins,
Aldo Donelli,
Jon Dorenbos,
Al Dorow,
Dean Dorsey,
Noble Doss,
Dameane Douglas,
Hugh Douglas,
Merrill Douglas,
Otis Douglas,
Woody Dow,
Harry Dowda,
Ted Doyle,
Joe Drake,
Troy Drake,
Robert Drummond,
Bobby Duckworth,
Paul Dudley,
Jon Dumbauld,
Rick Duncan,
Ken Dunek,
King Dunlap,
Jason Dunn,
Bill Dunstan,
John Durko

E
Anthony Edwards,
Herman Edwards,
Tom Ehlers,
John Eibner,
Mohammed Elewonibi,
Drew Ellis,
Ray Ellis,
Christian Elliss,
Swede Ellstrom,
Charles Emanuel,
Pete Emelianchik,
Carlos Emmons,
Frank Emmons,
Justin Ena,
Rick Engles,
Fred Enke,
Alonzo Ephraim,
Dick Erdlitz,
Larry Estes,
Byron Evans,
Donald Evans,
Mike Evans,
Eric Everett,
Major Everett,
Steve Everitt,
Zach Ertz

F
Carl Fagiolo,
Ray Farmer,
Ken Farragut,
Ron Fazio,
Jeff Feagles,
Gerald Feehery,
A. J. Feeley,
Fred Felber,
Happy Feller,
Dick Fencl,
Fritz Ferko,
Jack Ferrante,
Frank Ferrara,
Neil Ferris,
Bill Fiedler,
Jay Fiedler,
Brian Finneran,
Mickey Fitzgerald,
Scott Fitzkee,
Jim Flanigan,
Mike Flores,
Eric Floyd,
DeShawn Fogle,
Moise Fokou,
Nick Foles,
Brandon Fields
Chris Fontenot,
Carl Ford,
Charlie Ford,
Jim Foster,
Elbert Foules,
Dustin Fox,
Terry Fox,
Dick Frahm,
Hank Fraley,
Todd France,
Joseph Frank,
Cleveland Franklin,
Tony Franklin,
Dennis Franks,
Derrick Frazier,
Antonio Freeman,
Bobby Freeman,
Glenn Frey,
Bob Friedlund,
Bob Friedman,
George Fritts,
Ralph Fritz,
Jim Fritzsche,
William Frizzell,
Irving Fryar,
Travis Fulgham,
Frank Fuller,
James Fuller,
William Fuller,

G
Roman Gabriel,
Omar Gaither,
Bob Gambold,
Bob Gaona,
Jeff Garcia,
Barry Gardner,
Charlie Garner,
Gregg Garrity,
Russell Gary,
Charlie Gauer,
Blenda Gay,
Ed George,
Raymond George,
Woody Gerber,
Chris Gerhard,
Tom Gerhart,
Carl Gersbach,
Lou Ghecas,
Louie Giammona,
Hal Giancanelli,
Mario Giannelli,
Pat Gibbs,
Abe Gibron,
Frank Giddens,
Wimpy Giddens,
Lewis Gilbert,
Mike Gilbert,
Jimmie Giles,
Roger Gill,
Jim Gilmore,
Craig Gill,
Jerry Ginney,
Glenn Glass,
Fred Gloden,
Rich Glover,
Chris Gocong,
Brad Goebel,
Dallas Goedert,
Tim Golden,
Ralph Goldston,
Mike Golic,
Rudy Gollomb,
Bob Gonya,
John Goode,
Rob Goode,
Ron Goodwin,
Lamar Gordon,
Chuck Gorecki,
Gene Gossage,
Kurt Gouveia,
Dave Graham,
Brandon Graham,
Jeff Graham,
Lyle Graham,
Tom Graham,
Bud Grant,
Otis Grant,
Paul Grasmanis,
Ray Graves,
Cecil Gray,
Jim Gray,
Mel Gray,
Donnie Green,
Jamaal Green,
John Green,
Roy Green,
Kelly Gregg,
Ken Gregory,
Don Griffin,
Jeff Griffin,
Anthony Griggs,
Elois Grooms,
Earl Gros,
Burt Grossman,
Len Gudd,
Henry Gude,
Ralph Guglielmi,
Tony Guillory,
Mark Gunn,
Riley Gunnels

H
Elmer Hackney,
Michael Haddix,
Nick Haden,
Britt Hager,
Carl Hairston,
Chuck Hajek,
Andy Hall,
Chad Hall,
Irv Hall,
Rhett Hall,
Ron Hallstrom,
Bill Halverson,
Dean Halverson,
Skip Hamilton,
Uhuru Hamiter,
Dave Hampton,
William Hampton,
Karl Hankton,
Roscoe Hansen,
Homer Hanson,
Joselio Hanson,
Tom Hanson,
Clay Harbor,
Greg Harding,
Roger Harding,
Andre Hardy,
Marvin Hargrove,
Andy Harmon,
Maurice Harper,
Perry Harrington,
Al Harris (CB),
Al Harris (DL),
Jimmy Harris,
Jon Harris,
Leroy Harris,
Macho Harris,
Richard Harris,
Rod Harris,
Tim Harris,
Bob Harrison,
Dennis Harrison,
Granville Harrison,
Jerome Harrison,
Tyreo Harrison,
Clinton Hart,
Dick Hart,
Fred Hartman,
Richard Harvey,
Tim Hasselbeck,
Tim Hauck,
Ben Hawkins,
Aaron Hayden,
Ken Hayden,
Ed Hayes,
Joe Hayes,
Alvin Haymond,
Jo Jo Heath,
Vaughn Hebron,
Ralph Heck,
George Hegamin,
Ron Heller,
Jerome Henderson,
Zac Henderson,
Steve Hendrickson,
Alex Henery,
Chas Henry,
Maurice Henry,
Wally Henry,
Gary Henson,
Nate Herbig,
Todd Herremans,
Jeff Herrod,
Rob Hertel,
Kirk Hershey,
Bill Hewitt,
Artis Hicks,
Tom Higgins,
Mark Higgs,
Fred Hill,
King Hill,
P.J. Hill,
Jack Hinkle,
Billy Hix,
Terry Hoage,
Bill Hobbs,
Reggie Hodges,
Mike Hogan,
Lester Holmes,
Roderick Hood,
Alvin Hooks,
Mel Hoover,
Wes Hopkins,
Mike Horan,
Roy Hord,
Marty Horn,
Bill Horrell,
Clark Hoss,
Jameson Houston,
Bobby Howard,
Darren Howard,
Lane Howell,
Lynn Hoyem,
Bobby Hoying,
Frank Hrabetin,
John Huarte,
Bob Hudson,
John Hudson,
Brandon Hughes,
Chuck Hughes,
William Hughes,
Don Hultz,
Dick Humbert,
Claude Humphrey,
Calvin Hunt,
Phillip Hunt,
Tony Hunt,
Herman Hunter,
Jason Huntley,
Gerry Huth,
Tom Hutton,
Ken Huxhold,
John Huzvar

I
Mark Ingram Sr.,
Willie Irvin

J

Al Jackson,
Alonzo Jackson,
Bob Jackson,
DeSean Jackson,
Don Jackson,
Earnest Jackson,
Greg Jackson,
Harold Jackson,
Jamaal Jackson,
Johnny Jackson,
Keith Jackson,
Kenny Jackson,
Randy Jackson,
Trenton Jackson,
David Jacobs,
Proverb Jacobs,
Angelo James,
Lou James,
Ronald 'Po' James,
William James,
Ernie Janet,
Mike Jarmoluk,
Jaiquawn Jarrett,
Toimi Jarvi,
Edward Jasper,
Ron Jaworski,
Max Jean-Gilles,
Greg Jefferson,
Billy Jefferson,
Tom Jelesky,
Dietrich Jells,
Cullen Jenkins,
Izel Jenkins,
Tommy Jeter,
Dwayne Jiles,
Ove Johansson,
Al Johnson,
Albert Johnson,
Alonzo Johnson,
Alvin Johnson,
Bill Johnson,
Charles Johnson,
Charlie Johnson,
Chris Johnson,
Dirk Johnson,
Don Johnson,
Dwight Johnson,
Eric Johnson,
Gene Johnson,
Jay Johnson,
Jimmie Johnson,
Kevin Johnson,
Lee Johnson,
Maurice Johnson,
Norm Johnson,
Reggie Johnson,
Ron Johnson (DE),
Ron Johnson (WR),
Vaughan Johnson,
Don Jonas,
Chris T. Jones,
Dhani Jones,
Harry Jones,
Jimmie Jones,
Joe Jones,
Julian Jones,
Ray Jones,
Sean Jones,
Spike Jones,
Akeem Jordan,
Andrew Jordan,
Carl Jorgensen,
James Joseph,
Seth Joyner,
Sonny Jurgensen,
Winston Justice

K

Vyto Kab,
Mike Kafka,
Alai Kalaniuvalu,
N. D. Kalu,
Carl Kane,
John Kapele,
Bernie Kaplan,
Sonny Karnofsky,
Ed Kasky,
Steve Kaufusi,
George Kavel,
Jevon Kearse,
Ray Keeling,
Rabbit Keen,
Jim Kekeris,
Jason Kelce,
Ken Keller,
Bob Kelley,
Dwight Kelley,
Jim Kelly,
Joe Kelly,
Jeff Kemp,
Gus Kenneally,
Steve Kenney,
Merritt Kersey,
Wade Key,
Leroy Keyes,
Howard Keys,
Ed Khayat,
Frank Kilroy,
Jon Kimmel,
Randy Kinder,
Don King,
Kelly Kirchbaum,
Levon Kirkland,
Roger Kirkman,
Roy Kirksey,
Ben Kish,
John Klingel,
Pete Kmetovic,
Joe Knapper,
Charlie Knox,
Art Koeninger,
Kevin Kolb,
Elmer Kolberg,
Bill Koman,
Mark Konecny,
Walt Kowalczyk,
Scott Kowalkowski,
Kent Kramer,
Rich Kraynak,
Keith Krepfle,
Joe Kresky,
Robert Krieger,
Emmett Kriel,
Bert Kuczynski,
Mike Kullman,
Irv Kupcinet,
John Kusko

L
Galen Laack,
Mike Labinjo,
Porter Lainhart,
Sean Landeta,
Derek Landri,
Mort Landsberg,
Bob Landsee,
Israel Lang,
Jim Lankas,
Buck Lansford,
Bill Lapham,
Bill Larson,
Al Latimer,
Ted Laux,
Joe Lavender,
Robert Lavette,
Kent Lawrence,
Trevor Laws,
Reggie Lawrence,
Pete Lazetich,
Milton Leathers,
Harper LeBel,
Roy Lechthaler,
Toy Ledbetter,
Amp Lee,
Bernie Lee,
Byron Lee,
Frank LeMaster,
Jim Leonard,
Ron Leshinski,
Steve Levanitis,
Dorsey Levens,
Chad Lewis,
Darrell Lewis,
Dion Lewis,
Greg Lewis,
Joe Lewis,
Michael Lewis,
Tex Leyendecker,
Sammy Lilly,
Dave Lince,
Vic Lindskog,
Augie Lio,
John Lipski,
Peter Liske,
Greg Liter,
Dave Little,
Dave Lloyd,
James Lofton,
Randy Logan,
Matt Long,
Don Looney,
Ron Lou,
Tom Louderback,
Clarence Love,
Dick Lucas,
Bill Lueck,
Don Luft,
Tom Luken,
Herb Lusk

M
Ken MacAfee,
Jay MacDowell,
Jim MacMurdo,
Art Macioszczyk,
Bill Mack,
Bill Mackrides,
Jeremy Maclin,
John Magee,
Drew Mahalic,
Reno Mahe,
John Mallory,
Art Malone,
Mike Mamula,
Mike Mandarino,
Rosie Manning,
Ray Mansfield,
Von Mansfield,
Edgar Manske,
Baptiste Manzini,
Basilio Marchi,
Greg Mark,
Steve Markoe,
Duke Maronic,
Curtis Marsh,
Anthony Marshall,
Keyonta Marshall,
Larry Marshall,
Lemar Marshall,
Whit Marshall,
Aaron Martin,
Cecil Martin,
Kelvin Martin,
Steve Martin,
Wayne Mass,
Bob Masters,
Walt Masters,
Ed Matesic,
Evan Mathis,
Ollie Matson,
Casey Matthews,
Jordan Matthews,
Ryan Matthews,
Menil Mavraides,
Joe Mays,
Dean May,
Jermane Mayberry,
Rufus Mayes,
Jerry Mazzanti,
Wesley McAfee,
James McAlister,
Darnerien McCants,
Mike McClellan,
Mike McCloskey,
Eric McCoo,
LeSean McCoy,
Matt McCoy,
Josh McCown,
Fred McCrary,
Hugh McCullough,
Jim McCusker,
Don McDonald,
Les McDonald,
Tommy McDonald,
Robert McDonough,
Jerome McDougle,
Paul McFadden,
Mike McGlynn,
Tom McHale,
Pat McHugh,
Guy McIntyre,
Marlin McKeever,
Raleigh McKenzie,
Dennis McKnight,
Jim McMahon,
Mike McMahon,
Erik McMillan,
Dan McMillen,
Mark McMillian,
Billy McMullen,
Dexter McNabb,
Donovan McNabb,
Tom McNeill,
Forest McPherson,
Jerrold McRae,
Tim McTyer,
Ed Meadows,
Ron Medved,
John Mellekas,
Guido Merkens,
Fred Meyer,
John Meyers,
Rich Miano,
Ed Michaels,
Mike Michel,
John Michels (tackle),
John Michels (guard),
Oren Middlebrook,
Nick Mike-Mayer,
Quintin Mikell,
Keith Millard,
Bubba Miller,
Don Miller,
Tom Miller,
Al Milling,
Freddie Milons,
George Mira,
Dean Miraldi,
Gene Mitcham,
Brian Mitchell,
Freddie Mitchell,
Leonard Mitchell,
Martin Mitchell,
Randall Mitchell,
Ryan Moats,
Frank Molden,
Art Monk,
Henry Monroe,
Wilbert Montgomery,
Tim Mooney,
Damon Moore,
Rocco Moore
Zeke Moreno,
Sean Morey,
Dennis Morgan,
Mike Morgan,
Dwaine Morris,
Guy Morriss,
Bobby Morse,
Emmett Mortell,
Mark Moseley,
Dom Moselle,
George Mrkonic,
Joe Muha,
Horst Muhlmann,
George Mulligan,
Dick Murley,
Nick Murphy,
Calvin Murray,
DeMarco Murray,
Eddie Murray,
Franny Murray,
Brad Myers,
Jack Myers

N
Andy Nacrelli,
Mike Nease,
Al Nelson,
Tom Nelson,
Dennis Nelson,
Jim Nettles,
Charles Newton,
Gerald Nichols,
John Niland,
Maurice Nipp,
John Nocera,
John Norby,
Mark Nordquist,
Jerry Norton,
Jim Norton,
Walt Nowak

O
Don Oakes,
Harry O'Boyle,
Aaron O'Brien,
Davey O'Brien,
Ken O'Brien,
Henry Obst,
Derrick Oden,
Bill Olds,
Greg Oliver,
Hubie Oliver,
Brian O'Neal,
Jim Opperman,
Red O'Quinn,
Bob Oristaglio,
Elliott Ormsbe,
Mike Osborn,
Richard Osborne,
John Outlaw,
Bill Overmyer,
Don Owens,
Terrell Owens

P
Dave Pacella,
Max Padlow,
Joe Pagliei,
Lonnie Palelei,
Joe Panos,
Vince Papale,
Artimus Parker,
Juqua Parker,
Rodney Parker,
Cody Parkey,
Jim Parmer,
Josh Parry,
Gordon Paschka,
Dan Pastorini,
Rupert Pate,
Dmitri Patterson,
Mike Patterson,
Cliff Patton,
Jerry Patton,
Ken Payne,
Clarence Peaks,
Doug Pederson,
Rodney Peete,
Bob Pellegrini,
Jairo Penaranda,
Woody Peoples,
Pete Perot,
Mike Perrino,
Bruce Perry,
William Perry,
Floyd Peters,
Jason Peters,
Volney Peters,
Gary Pettigrew,
Gerry Philbin,
Ray Phillips,
Bob Picard,
Ross Pierschbacher
Pete Pihos,
Joe Pilconis,
Cyril Pinder,
Todd Pinkston,
Henry Piro,
Joe Pisarcik,
Alabama Pitts,
Mike Pitts,
Joe Pivarnick,
Ray Poage,
Al Pollard,
Tom Polley,
Geoffrey Pope,
Ron Porter,
Phil Poth,
Art Powell,
Ron Powlus,
Steve Preece,
Robert Priestly,
Nick Prisco,
Bosh Pritchard,
Stanley Pritchett,
Garry Puetz,
Bob Pylman,
Jim Pyne

Q
Mike Quick,
Bill Quinlan

R
George Rado,
Phil Ragazzo,
Herschel Ramsey,
Knox Ramsey,
LaJuan Ramsey,
Nate Ramsey,
Lou Rash,
Leo Raskowski,
Don Ratliff,
John Rauch,
Sam Rayburn,
Jimmy Raye,
Jamie Reader,
Frank Reagan,
Montae Reagor,
Jalen Reagor,
John Reaves,
Dave Recher,
James Reed,
J.R. Reed,
Michael Reed,
Taft Reed,
Henry Reese,
Ike Reese,
Ken Reeves,
Marion Reeves,
Mike Reichenbach,
Jerry Reichow,
Alan Reid,
Mike Reid,
Kevin Reilly,
Leonard Renfro,
Will Renfro,
Jay Repko,
Joe Restic,
Pete Retzlaff,
Ray Reutt,
Jim Ricca,
Bobby Richards,
Paul Richardson,
Jess Richardson,
Greg Richmond,
Dick Riffle,
Lee Riley,
Dave Rimington,
Jim Ringo,
Ray Rissmiller,
Jon Ritchie,
Joe Robb,
John Roberts,
Burle Robinson,
Jacque Robinson,
Jerry Robinson,
Wayne Robinson,
Saverio Rocca,
Dominique Rodgers-Cromartie,
William Roffler,
John Rogalla,
Dan Rogas,
Brian Rolle,
Bill Romanowski,
Ray Romero,
Dedrick Roper,
John Roper,
Ken Rose,
Alvin Ross,
Oliver Ross,
Tim Rossovich,
Allen Rossum,
Herbert Roton,
Tom Roussel,
Ev Rowan,
Bob Rowe,
Mark Royals,
Guy Rubei,
Joe Rudolph,
Max Runager,
Jon Runyan,
Booker Russell,
James Russell,
Lafayette "Reb" Russell,
Rusty Russell,
Roger Ruzek,
Pat Ryan,
Rocky Ryan,
Paul Ryczek,
Mark Rypien,

S
Steve Sader,
Tom Saidock,
Lawrence Sampleton,
Bill Sampy,
Michael Samson,
Asante Samuel,
Bobby Samuels,
Mark Sanchez,
John Sanders,
John Sanders,
Miles Sanders,
Thomas Sanders,
Dan Sandifer,
Theron Sapp,
George Savitsky,
James Saxon,
Joe Scarpati,
Mike Schad,
Ryan Schau,
Owen Schmitt,
Don Schaefer,
Ted Schmitt,
Bob Schnelker,
Matt Schobel,
Jim Schrader,
Adam Schreiber,
Jake Schuehle,
Eberle Schultz,
Jody Schulz,
John Sciarra,
Steve Sciullo,
Boston Scott,
Clyde Scott,
Gari Scott,
Ian Scott,
Tom Scott,
Ben Scotti,
Leon Seals,
Vic Sears,
Mark Seay,
Mike Sebastian,
Rob Selby,
Bob Shann,
Ed Sharkey,
Harry Shaub,
Ricky Shaw,
Lito Sheppard,
Al Sherman,
Heath Sherman,
Marshall Shires,
John Shonk,
Jason Short,
Mickey Shuler,
Mike Siano,
Vai Sikahema,
John Simerson,
Clyde Simmons,
Corey Simon,
Mark Simoneau,
Kaseem Sinceno,
Michael Sinclair,
Reggie Singletary,
Jerry Sisemore,
Manny Sistrunk,
Jimmie Skaggs,
Leo Skladany,
Tom Skladany,
Mark Slater,
Henry Slay,
Jeremy Slechta,
Jessie Small,
Torrance Small,
Wendell Smallwood,
Fred Smalls,
Rod Smart,
Rudy Smeja,
Dennis Smelser,
Alex Smith,
Ben Smith,
Bob Smith,
Charles Smith,
Chris Smith,
Darrin Smith,
Daryle Smith,
Devonta Smith,
J.D. Smith,
Jack Smith,
Jackie Smith,
John Smith,
L. J. Smith,
Milton Smith,
Otis Smith,
Phil Smith,
Ralph Smith,
Ray Smith,
Rich Smith,
Ron Smith,
Steve Smith,
Steve Smith,
Troy Smith,
Dave Smukler,
Norm Snead,
Lum Snyder,
John Sodaski,
Freddie Solomon,
Ron Solt,
George Somers,
Stephen Spach,
John Spagnola,
Takeo Spikes,
Ray Spillers,
Darren Sproles,
John Stackpool,
Siran Stacy,
Dick Stafford,
Duce Staley,
Donté Stallworth,
Ernie Steele,
Dick Steere,
Larry Steinbach,
Gil Steinke,
Bill Stetz,
Don Stevens,
Matt Stevens,
Pete Stevens,
Richard Stevens,
Dean Steward,
Tony Stewart,
Walt Stickel,
Herschel Stockton,
Jack Stoll,
Ed Storm,
Tom Strauthers,
Bill Stribling,
Donald Strickland,
Bill Striegel,
Bob Stringer,
Bill Stromberg,
Danny Stubbs,
Cecil Sturgeon,
Caleb Sturgis,
Jerry Sturm,
Bob Suffridge,
Leo Sugar,
Tom Sullivan,
Len Supulski,
Joe Sutton,
William Summers,
Mitch Sutton,
Justin Swift,
Jeff Sydner,
Len Szafaryn,
Frank Szymanski

T

Dan Talcott,
George Taliaferro,
Ben Tamburello,
Thomas Tapeh,
Darryl Tapp,
George Tarasovic,
John Tarver,
Carl Taseff,
Junior Tautalatasi,
Terry Tautolo,
Bobby Taylor,
Prince Tega Wanogho,
John Teltschik,
Al Thacker,
Art Thoms,
Hollis Thomas,
Johnny Thomas,
Juqua Thomas,
Tra Thomas,
William Thomas,
Bobby Thomason,
Jeff Thomason,
John Thomason,
Broderick Thompson,
Don Thompson,
Russ Thompson,
Tommy Thompson,
Richard Thornton,
Rod Trafford,
James Thrash,
Jim Thrower,
Bob Thurbon,
Michael Timpson,
Scott Tinsley,
Mel Tom,
Lou Tomasetti,
Anthony Toney,
Bob Torrey,
John Tosi,
Greg Townsend,
John Tracey,
Greg Tremble,
Milt Trost,
Jeremiah Trotter,
Jeff Tupper,
Guy Turnbow,
Kevin Turner,
Willie Turral,
Rick Tuten,
Joe Tyrrell

U
Michael Ulmer,
Morris Unutoa,
Tuufuli Uperesa,
Bob Unger

V
Zack Valentine,
Norm Van Brocklin,
Ebert Van Buren,
Steve Van Buren,
Julian Vandervelde,
Alex Van Dyke,
Bruce Van Dyke,
Arunas Vasys,
Roger Vick,
Michael Vick,
Troy Vincent,
Kimo von Oelhoffen

W

Steve Wagner,
Frank Wainright,
Billy Walik,
Adam Walker,
Corey Walker,
Darwin Walker,
Herschel Walker,
Al Wallace,
Bobby Walston,
Pete Walters,
Stan Walters,
Johnnie Walton,
Jim Ward,
Matt Ware,
Scott Ware,
Buist "Buss" Warren,
Chris Warren,
Andre Waters,
Mike Waters,
Danny Watkins,
Foster Watkins,
Larry Watkins,
Edwin Watson,
Tim Watson,
Ricky Watters,
Nate Wayne,
Robert Wear,
Jim Weatherall,
Jed Weaver,
Leonard Weaver,
Chuck Weber,
Don Weedon,
Ted Wegert,
Reds Weiner,
Isadore Weinstock,
John Welbourn,
Casey Weldon,
Billy Wells,
Harold Wells,
Joseph Wendlick,
Carson Wentz,
Jeff Wenzel,
Ed West,
Hodges West,
Troy West,
Brian Westbrook,
Jim Whalen,
Mark Wheeler,
John Whire,
Allison White,
Reggie White,
Tracy White,
Brandon Whiting,
David Whitmore,
Fred Whittingham,
Barry Wilburn,
John Wilcox,
Reggie Wilkes,
Jeff Wilkins,
Erwin Will,
Norm Willey,
Ben Williams,
Bernard Williams,
Bobbie Williams,
Boyd Williams,
Calvin Williams,
Charley Williams,
Clyde Williams,
Henry "Gizmo" Williams,
Jerry Williams,
Joel Williams,
Mike Williams,
Ted Williams,
Tex Williams,
Tyrone Williams,
James Willis,
Diddie Willson,
Bill Wilson,
Brenard Wilson,
Harry Wilson,
Jerry Wilson,
Osborne Wilson,
Vernon Winfield,
Dean Wink,
Dennis Wirgowski,
Al Wistert,
Derrick Witherspoon,
Will Witherspoon,
John Wittenborn,
Alex Wojciechowicz,
Clem Woltman,
Marc Woodard,
Tom Woodeshick,
Lee Woodruff,
Tony Woodruff,
Neil Worden,
Mike Woulfe,
Gordon Wright,
Sylvester Wright,
Al Wukits,
Antwuan Wyatt,
Frank Wydo,
John Wyhonic,
Dexter Wynn,
William Wynn

Y
Adrian Young,
Charle Young,
Glen Young,
Michael Young,
Roynell Young,
Scott Young,
Vince Young,
Sid Youngelman,
John Yovicsin

Z
Steve Zabel,
Mike Zandofsky,
Luis Zendejas,
Frank Ziegler,
John Zilly,
Don Zimmerman,
Roy Zimmerman,
Vince Zizak,
Eric Zomalt,
Michael Zordich,
Jim Zyntell

References
 
 
 
 
 
 
 
 
 
 
 
 
 
 

Philadelphia Eagles players
Phi
players